John Beal may refer to:

 John Beal (actor) (1909–1997), American actor
 John Beal (composer), American film composer and conductor
 John W. Beal (1887–1971), American architect

See also
John Beall (disambiguation)
John Beale (disambiguation)